Francis-Roland Lambert (born in 1921 in Lawrence, Massachusetts) was an American clergyman and bishop for the Roman Catholic Diocese of Port-Vila. He was appointed bishop in 1976. He died in 1997.

References 

1921 births
1997 deaths
American Roman Catholic bishops by contiguous area of the United States
Roman Catholic bishops of Port-Vila
20th-century American clergy